Rebore, vol. 0: Vision Recreation by Eye is a 2001 album by experimental noise rock band Boredoms. It is the final in the series of four remix albums of Boredoms material and was compiled and mixed entirely by Eye.

Track listing
"7" – 8:40
"77" – 6:31
"777" – 7:27
"7777" – 8:42
"77777" – 4:46
"777777" – 7:26
"7777777" – 6:54

(Note: The track entitled "7" on this release is different than the tracks titled "7" on Super Roots 6 and Super Roots 7.)

Boredoms albums
2000 remix albums
Warner Music Group remix albums